Annette Pehnt (born 1967 in Cologne) is a German writer and literary critic. She lives in Freiburg in Baden-Württemberg.

After graduating from school in 1986 Pehnt performed voluntary social work in Belfast. After a year living in Scotland, she studied English, Celtic studies and German language and literature at the University of Cologne, University of Galway, University of California, Berkeley and University of Freiburg. After her master's degree and the first national examination in 1994, graduation followed in 1997 at the University of Freiburg with a work on Irish literature.

Since 1992 Pehnt, married and mother of three children, has lived as a literature critic and self-employed author in Freiburg and teaches at the University of Hildesheim, where she leads the Institut für Literarisches Schreiben & Literaturwissenschaft.

Awards
 2001 
 2002 Preis der Jury des Ingeborg-Bachmann-Wettbewerbs
 2004 Großes Stipendium des Darmstädter Literaturfonds
 2008 Thaddäus-Troll-Preis
 2009 Italo-Svevo-Preis
 2012 Solothurner Literaturpreis
 2012 Hermann-Hesse-Preis
 2017 Kulturpreis Baden-Württemberg
 2020 Rheingau Literatur Preis

Memberships
 PEN Centre Germany

Works

Novels

Dissertation

For children
Pehnt wrote several children books.

Film versions
 2012 , director: Nicole Weegmann (TV film, Bayerischer Rundfunk)

References

Further reading

External links 

 
 Artists' Prize 
 Kurzrezensionen des Perlentauchers zu "Insel 34" 

1967 births
Living people
German women writers
German women critics
German literary critics
Women literary critics